Rasta Business is a studio album by Jamaican reggae singer Burning Spear. It was released in 1995 through Heartbeat Records. Recording sessions took place at Grove Recording Studio in Ocho Rios.

It was nominated for a Grammy Award for Best Reggae Album at the 38th Annual Grammy Awards in 1996.

Track listing

Personnel
Winston Rodney – vocals, percussion, akete, harmony, producer
Carol "Passion" Nelson – harmony vocals
Nelson Miller – backing vocals (track 9), drums, percussion
Archibald "Tedo" Davis – backing vocals (track 9)
Jay Noel – synthesizer (tracks: 1, 4)
Robert Lyn – piano, synthesizers
Lenford Richards – lead guitar, funde
Rupert Bent – lead guitar
Lenval "Shayar" Jarrett – rhythm guitar
Paul Beckford – bass
Basil Cunningham – bass (track 11)
Alvin Haughton – percussion
Uziah "Sticky" Thompson – percussion
Mark Wilson – saxophone
Dean Fraser – saxophone
Charles Dickey – trombone
Ronald "Nambo" Robinson – trombone
James Smith – trumpet
Junior "Chico" Chin – trumpet
Barry O'Hare – recording, mixing
Dr. Toby Mountain – mastering
Garret Vandermolen – album supervision
Nancy Given – design
Shona Valeska – photography

Chart history

References

External links

1995 albums
Burning Spear albums
Heartbeat Records albums